Allen F. Reynolds (February 15, 1938 – December 11, 2019) is a former American college and professional football guard who played eight seasons in the American Football League from 1960-1967 for the Dallas Texans/Kansas City Chiefs. Allen is an alumnus of Tarkio College in Tarkio Missouri where he was inducted into the Tarkio College Hall of Fame in 1987.

Al Reynolds played in 98 games  with the Texans/Chiefs and was a starter in 56 of those games through his career in the AFL. Al is also credited with 1 fumble  in his career but when questioned about this his only reaction was "I did? I don't remember that." The NFL apparently doesn't know which game it was in. Only that the fumble occurred during the 1966 season in which the Chiefs went on to play Green Bay in the first AFL-NFL World Championship. Since Allen was an offensive lineman it can only be assumed this happened during an attempt to recover a fumble by another player.

Allen's official position was right guard but during his career with the Texans and Chiefs he proved valuable at several positions in the offensive line. He is credited with playing both left and right guard and well as playing right offensive tackle.

After the 1967 season Allen did not immediately retire from pro football. Before the 1968 season the NFL expanded into Cincinnati with the Bengals football club. During the expansion draft that year, the Bengals drafted several of the Kansas City Chiefs including offensive guard Allen Reynolds. Allen spent time with the team before the season began but ultimately decided to retire from pro football and keep his family rooted in Kansas City. He did not play any games with the Cincinnati Bengals.

At the time of his retirement, Al was married to his wife Diane Reynolds and had 3 young daughters, Jennifer, Monica and Alicia. He and Diane would later have 2 more children, son's Allen and Thomas.

References

See also
Other American Football League players

1938 births
Living people
People from Jefferson County, Kansas
Players of American football from Kansas
American football offensive guards
Tarkio Owls football players
Dallas Texans (AFL) players
Kansas City Chiefs players
American Football League players